Cross at Sunset is an oil on canvas painting by Thomas Cole. Believed to have been created around 1848, it was left unfinished due to his premature death that year.

Artist's background

Tom Christopher wrote that “[Thomas] Cole’s greatest artistic asset proved to be his untutored eye.”  Cole emigrated to America with his family in the spring of 1819 at the age of eighteen.  As a child, his surroundings were of Lancashire, England, an area known to be an epicenter of Britain’s primarily industrial region.  Because of this, Cole was granted an additional clarity of and sensitivity to the vibrancy of American landscapes awash with color, a stark contrast to the bleak and subdued landscapes of the country he left behind. As he aged and recognized his own mortality, Cole transitioned away from natural landscape paintings to focus on works conveying religious and spiritual themes.

Composition
Due to it being unfinished, it is possible to see the underdrawing and the undertone applied in the foreground.

References

Works cited
 Christopher, Tom. "Living Off the Landscape: How Thomas Cole and Frederick Church made Themselves at Home in the Hudson River Valley." Humanities 30, no. 4 (2009):6-11.
 Noble, Luis Legrand. The Life and Works of Thomas Cole. Edited by Elliot S. Vesell Cambridge, Massachusetts: The Belknap Press of Harvard University Press, 1964.
 Great Northern Catskills of Greene County. “Hudson River School of Art”. http://www.greatnortherncatskills.com/arts-culture/hudson-river-school-art.

External links
 Explore Thomas Cole provided by the National Park Service

1848 paintings
Paintings by Thomas Cole
Hudson River School paintings
Crosses in art
Unfinished paintings
Paintings in the Thyssen-Bornemisza Museum